The 1955 Jordan League was the 10th season of Jordan League, Al-Jazeera won its second title.

Overview
Al-Jazeera won the championship.

References

RSSSF

External links
 Jordan Football Association website

Jordanian Pro League seasons
Jordan
Jordan
football